The 2010 Tour de Langkawi was the 15th edition of the Tour de Langkawi, a cycling stage race that took place in Malaysia. The race began on 1 March in Kota Bharu and ended on 7 March in Merdeka Square, Kuala Lumpur. The race was sanctioned by the Union Cycliste Internationale (UCI) as a 2.HC (hors category) race on the 2009–10 UCI Asia Tour calendar.

José Rujano of Venezuela became the overall winner of the race, followed by Gong Hyo-Suk of South Korea second and Hossein Askari of Iran third. Anuar Manan representing  made history when he became the first Malaysian cyclist to win a stage, which he won the Stage 5. Manan also became the first Malaysian cyclist to win the points classification. Peter McDonald won the mountains classification category.  was the leader of team classification of the race.

Teams
20 teams accepted invitations to participate in the 2010 Tour de Langkawi. 

 
 
 
 
 
 Seoul Cycling Team
 
 Aisan Racing Team
 
 
 
 Team Jayco–Skins 
 
 
 
 South Africa ‡
 Kazakhstan ‡
 Malaysia ‡
 Polygon Sweet Nice
 Thailand ‡

‡: National teams

Stages

The cyclists competed in 7 stages, covering a distance of 1,013.9 kilometres.

Classification leadership

Final standings

General classification

Points classification

Mountains classification

Asian rider classification

Team classification

Asian team classification

Stage results

Stage 1
1 March 2010 — Kota Bharu to Kuala Berang,

Stage 2
2 March 2010 — Kuala Terengganu to Chukai,

Stage 3
3 March 2010 — Pekan to Mersing,

Stage 4
4 March 2010 — Mersing to Parit Sulong,

Stage 5
5 March 2010 — Muar to Port Dickson,

Stage 6 
6 March 2010 — Putrajaya to Genting Highlands,

Stage 7
7 March 2010 — Kuala Kubu Bharu to Dataran Merdeka,

References

External links
 

Tour de Langkawi
2010 in road cycling
2010 in Malaysian sport